George E. Ashman (24 August 1929 – 27 March 2015) was an Australian rules footballer who played with Fitzroy in the Victorian Football League (VFL).

Notes

External links 
		

2015 deaths
1929 births
Australian rules footballers from Victoria (Australia)
Fitzroy Football Club players